Paul Day (born 1967) is a British sculptor. His high-relief sculptures in terracotta, resin, and bronze have been exhibited widely in Europe and his work is known for its unusual approach to perspective.

Major works include:

 The Battle of Britain Monument on the Victoria Embankment in London
 Iraq and Afghanistan Memorial (2017), in Victoria Embankment Gardens

In 2008 a high-relief frieze was added to the base of The Meeting Place as part of refurbishments at St Pancras, featuring images from the history of the Tube and train: people queuing on platforms or travelling in carriages; soldiers departing for war and returning injured, and repair works following the 7 July 2005 London bombings. The work was the object of controversy when first erected, as one panel depicted a commuter falling into the path of a train driven by the Grim Reaper. However, following discussions with London and Continental Railways (LCR), this panel was replaced with another.

Day studied at art schools in the UK at Colchester and Dartington, and completed his training at Cheltenham in 1991. He now lives in a village near Dijon, France, with his French wife, Catherine. Their Anglo-French relationship is an explicit and repeated theme in his works.

The Meeting Place, which is modelled on an embrace between Paul and Catherine, stands as a metaphor for St Pancras's role as the terminus of the rail link between England and France. Another contemporary sculptor and critic, Antony Gormley, singled out The Meeting Place when he condemned the current public art works across the UK, stating: "there is an awful lot of crap out there". Day admitted that "Some will say it is a chocolate box sculpture."

In December 2017, Day received criticism for accepting a commission to create a sculpture in Moscow of  the late Uzbek leader Islam Karimov, "widely regarded as one of the most ruthless dictators in recent history", and responded, "I go with the flow".

References

External links
 
 

1967 births
Living people
British sculptors
British male sculptors